Barry Keenan (1940 – November 13, 2022) was an American businessman, best known as the mastermind behind the 1963 kidnapping of Frank Sinatra Jr.

At the age of 21, Keenan was already successful in the business world, as well as being the youngest member of the Los Angeles Stock Exchange. Following a car accident, Keenan became penniless and addicted to painkillers, and he eventually hatched the kidnap-for-ransom scheme and enlisted others to help. Keenan, along with Johnny Irwin and Joe Amsler, conspired to kidnap Frank Sinatra, Jr. Keenan had a psychiatric condition in which he heard voices, and felt that his plan was blessed by God; since he intended to eventually pay the money back, he did not think the kidnapping was immoral. After successfully abducting Sinatra Jr. from the Harrah's Lodge at South Lake Tahoe, Keenan made contact with Frank Sinatra Sr. to make ransom arrangements. Sinatra initially offered one million dollars, but Keenan demanded significantly less instead: $240,000. (In 2022 terms, the demand paid would be the equivalent of $2.32 million, and the amount Sinatra offered would be equivalent to $9.68 million.) Despite the nature of the crime, Keenan felt that he was bringing the Sinatra family closer together and assisting the Sinatras in other intangible ways.

Sinatra paid the ransom, and the three men released his son. Within days, all three conspirators were apprehended by the FBI. Keenan was sentenced to life plus seventy-five years in prison for his crimes, but only served four and a half years before he was released, on the grounds that he was legally insane at the time of the crime.

After his release, Keenan became successful as a real estate developer.

The kidnapping was the basis for Stealing Sinatra, a Showtime movie released in 2003 starring David Arquette and William H. Macy. In March 2020, it was announced that Keenan will be played by Grant Gustin in Operation Blue Eyes, a biopic about his kidnapping of Frank Sinatra, Jr. The film will be directed by Joe Mantegna.

Keenan was interviewed about the affair by Ira Glass in a February 2002 episode of the WBEZ radio show This American Life, and by Mike Lanchin in a January 2014 episode of the BBC Radio 4 series Witness.

References

1940 births
Living people
American businesspeople
American kidnappers
American businesspeople convicted of crimes